The South Africa women's national under-21 field hockey team represents South Africa in international field hockey matches and tournaments.

Tournament history

Youth Olympic Games
2010 - 6th
2014 - 8th
2018 - 4th

African Youth Games
2018 -

Current squad

The squad was announced on 6 September 2018.

Head coach: Tsoanelo Pholo

Gallery

See also
South Africa women's national field hockey team
South Africa women's national under-21 field hockey team

References

Field hockey
under-21 national team